Fleitas is a surname. Notable people with the surname include:

Ana Fleitas (born 1992), Paraguayan footballer 
Andrés Fleitas (1916–2011), Cuban baseball player
Ángel Fleitas (1914–2006), Cuban baseball player
Epifanio Méndez Fleitas (1917–1985), Paraguayan musician, writer, and poet, and central bank president
José Fleitas (born 1986), Paraguayan footballer
Leandro Fleitas (born 1983), Argentine footballer
Manuel Fleitas Solich (1900–1984), Paraguayan football player and coach
Marcelo Fleitas (born 1973), Uruguayan-Ecuadorian football coach and former player
Mariana Fleitas (born 1981), Uruguayan handball player
Miguel Fleitas (born 1956), Cuban-American visual artist, photographer, and film director
Omar Fleitas Castellano (born 1991), Spanish footballer 
Roberto Fleitas (born 1932), Uruguayan football head coach and former player
Sebastián Fleitas (1947–2000), Paraguayan football player